Sanana may be:
 Kunja language (Papuan)
 Sula language